Kirjurinluoto Arena (also known as Pori Delta Arena) is an open-air concert park in the city of Pori, Finland. It is the only venue in Finland that is designed especially for open-air events. Size of the amphitheater-type arena is five hectares (12 acres). Concert park area includes also 22 hectares for camping and parking.

Kirjurinluoto Arena was built in 2001 and it is part of the Pori National Urban Park. The arena is located in Kirjurinluoto island, which lies in the delta of Kokemäenjoki-river. The island has been a park and a recreational area for the residents of Pori since the 19th century.

Main user of the Kirjurinluoto Arena is annual Pori Jazz festival. Arena has also hosted RMJ and Sonisphere music festivals as well as several fairs and religious events.

Major events
2002
16 July; Paul Simon
18 July; Chaka Khan
2006
22 July; Sting 
2008
16 July; Pori 450th anniversary concert 
18 July; Santana  
2009 
25 July; Metallica 
2010
8 August; Iron Maiden 
2011
16 July; Elton John (Greatest Hits Tour)
2015
17 July; Jessie J (Sweet Talker Tour)
2019
19 July; Christina Aguilera (The X Tour)

Sources
City of Pori
History of Pori Jazz

Buildings and structures in Pori
Tourist attractions in Satakunta
Music venues in Finland

de:Kirjurinluoto